Prince  was a Japanese statesman and Lord Keeper of the Privy Seal of Japan during the Meiji era.

Life

Tokydaiji Sanetsune was born to a branch of the Fujiwara court nobility in Kyoto. His father was Tokudaiji Kin'ito, and his brother was Saionji Kinmochi, later Prime Minister of Japan.

Joining the sonnō jōi ("Revere the Emperor, Expel the Barbarian") faction in Court against westernization and the Tokugawa shogunate, he was forced to flee Kyoto during the coup d'état by the moderate samurai of the Aizu and Satsuma domains on 18 August 1863. He returned after the Meiji Restoration and served in a number of posts in the new government. He became a Dainagon in 1869.

In 1884, he was given the title of koshaku (marquis) under the new kazoku nobility rankings, and was subsequently elevated to koshaku (prince).  In 1891 he became Lord Keeper of the Privy Seal of Japan a post he held until Emperor Meiji's death. He felt very strongly that the Emperor should not involve himself in politics or in the decision-making process of government.

Honours
Grand Cordon of the Order of the Rising Sun (22 November 1877)
Marquess (7 July 1884)
Grand Cordon of the Order of the Rising Sun with Paulownia Flowers (7 October 1895)
Grand Cordon of the Order of the Chrysanthemum (1 April 1906)
Prince (21 April 1911)
Collar of the Order of the Chrysanthemum (4 June 1919; posthumous)

Order of precedence
Fifth rank, junior grade (12th day of the seventh month of the first year of Kaei (1848))
Fifth rank, senior grade (Fifth day of the first month of the second year of Kaei (1849))
Senior fifth rank, junior grade (Third day of the second month of the third year of Kaei (1850))
Fourth rank, junior grade (28th day of the seventh month of the fourth year of Kaei (1851))
Fourth rank, senior grade (27th day of the first month of the fifth year of Kaei (1852))
Senior fourth rank, junior grade (Eighth day of the fifth month of the sixth year of Kaei (1853))
Third rank (19th day of the 12th month of the fourth year of Ansei (1857))
Senior third rank (24th day of the third month of the fifth year of Ansei (1858))
Second rank (24th day of the 12th month of the second year of Bunkyu (1862))
Senior second rank (28th day of the second month of the third year of Keio (1867))
First rank (December of the 32nd year of Meiji, or 1899)

References

1840 births
1919 deaths
Deaths from Spanish flu
Japanese politicians
Honorary Knights Grand Cross of the Order of St Michael and St George
Honorary Knights Grand Cross of the Royal Victorian Order
Kazoku
People from Kyoto Prefecture
Tokudaiji family
Recipients of the Order of the Plum Blossom